Lamprosema lunulalis is a moth in the family Crambidae. It was described by Jacob Hübner in 1823. It is found in Suriname.

References

Moths described in 1823
Lamprosema
Moths of South America